Carolyn Winfrey Gillette is a hymn writer and Presbyterian pastor.  She has written over 400 hymns that are sung throughout the USA and the world.  Gillette and her husband Bruce are the pastors of First Presbyterian Union Church in Owego, New York since December 2018.

Hymn use
Gillette's hymns can be found on thousands of website, been sung by congregations in every state of the US and in several other countries; they have been on national PBS-TV three times and the BBC-TV in the United Kingdom. Noel Paul Stookey of "Peter, Paul and Mary" made a music video with Emmy winner Pete Staman of Carolyn's hymn, "O God, Our Words Cannot Express," which was written on September 11.

Her hymns are found on the national websites of the General Board of Discipleship of The United Methodist Church, UMCOR, the Presbyterian Church (USA), American Baptist Churches, the Evangelical Lutheran Church in America, the Reformed Church in America, the Souper Bowl of Caring, the National Council of Churches, and Church World Service. United Methodist Bishop William Boyd Grove and Gillette were commissioned to write hymns for the inauguration services for Churches Uniting in Christ.

Books
Gillette's book Gifts of Love: New Hymns for Today's Worship (Geneva Press, 2000) is a collection of forty-five of her hymns. Songs of Grace:  Hymns for Good and Neighbor (Upper Room Books) has Her hymns are also in the new supplements for the Episcopal and Presbyterian hymnals. The United Church of Canada's hymnal supplement (2007) will include six of her hymns. The Circuit Rider, The Christian Century, The Presbyterian Outlook, Presbyterians Today, Horizons, Ideas! For Church Leaders, Church & Society, and other magazines have published her hymns. Two of her anthems were recently published by the Choristers Guild. She was commissioned to write the lead article for the special issue on "Singing Our Lives" for Baylor University's Christian Reflection journal in 2006.

Family background
Gillette and her husband Bruce have previously served as pastors in Philadelphia, Wilmington (Delaware), Pitman (New Jersey) and Sussex County (New Jersey). They wrote the ecumenical guide for the Active Parenting Now (third edition) with Mary Jane Pierce Norton of The United Methodist General Board of Discipleship as a consultant. They wrote the study/action guide for Transforming Families and the Christian Family Week worship and educational resource for the Presbyterian Church (USA).

Biography
She was born in Harrisonburg, Virginia on May 28, 1961.  She grew up in a Methodist family, and her father was a graduate of Drew Seminary. She was baptized and confirmed in Methodist congregations. She graduated from United Methodist Church-related Lebanon Valley College.  She and her husband Bruce are graduates for Princeton Theological Seminary.  They are the parents of three children and four grandchildren.

Hymns
A Prayer for Our Children (Lament and Prayer about Violence & School Shootings)
A Voice Was Heard in Ramah (prayer for peace in Middle East and beyond)
All the Music Sung and Played Here (church music)
An Eagle Is Soaring (rise up on wings like eagles)
Another Son Is Killed/other title (peace)
Be Doers of the Word of God (James)
Bigger Barns (Jesus’ parable of the rich fool)
Blessed Are the Poor Among You (Beatitudes in Luke)
Christ Be With Us (Mission, Lord's Supper & Church Unity)
Christ Taught Us of a Farmer (100th Anniversary of St. Paul's Lutheran Church in Warren, IL)
Christ, You Walked Among the Grain Fields (Foods Resource Bank)
Come, You Hungry Ones (Service of Wholeness and Healing)
Creator God, You Made the Earth (creation/Sabbath)
Creator of the Water (Baptism)
Creator, We Thank You for All You Have Made  (beauty of creation in everyday)
Down by the Jordan (Jesus’ baptism)
Early On a Sunday (Easter)
Fear Not!” the Angel Said (Christmas)
For Freedom, Christ Has Set Us Free! (Galatians)
For This Land In All Its Wonder (Hymn for the Nation)
Gifts of Love Our Lord Has Given (Ten Commandments)
Giving God, We Pause and Wonder (vision for tithing)
Go Walk with God (Benediction Response or Goodbye Hymn for Those Moving Away)
God Made the Heavens and the Earth (Creation and Environmental Stewardship)
God of Creation (Katrina Relief)
God of Generations (Church for All Ages)
God of Love, We Sing Your Glory (Limestone’s 50th)
God of the Women (Biblical Women and Ministry)
God Your Blessings Overflow! (Thanksgiving)
God, How Can We Comprehend? (refugees)
God, How Many Are A Thousand (New Year)
God, In Joy We Gather (Wedding)
God, May Your Justice Roll Down (justice)
God, We Await Your Advent Here (Advent & Simpler Living)
God, We Have Come From Our Families and Homes 30th Anniversary of Ulster Project/DE
God, We Join in Celebration (Neshaminy Presbyterian Church anniversary)
God, We Sing and Worship (Confirmation)
God, We Spend a Lifetime Growing (older adults)
God, We Walk Through Death's Deep Valley (Funeral)
God, We’ve Known Such Grief and Anger (9/11 anniversary)
God, What a Faith-Filled Mystery! (Good Friday and Atonement)
God, When You Called Our Church by Grace (Blackwood Presbyterian Church anniversary)
God, Whose Love Is Always Stronger (peace)
God, With Joy We Look Around Us (racial justice)
God, You Give Us Recreation (A Hymn for Souper Bowl Sunday)
God, You Love the World! (Mission Trip Dedication or Closing Hymn)
God, You Wrap Your Love Around Us (A Hymn for Church World Service's Blanket Sunday)
God, Your Gift of Peace is Precious (Peacemaking)
God, Your Love and Care Surround Us (funeral)
God's Great Love is So Amazing! (Luke 15 Parables of Lost Sheep, Coin and Son)
Hear My Prayer For Unity (Christian Unity and Jesus' Prayer in John 17)
How Lovely Is Your Church, O Lord (Episcopal anniversary)
I Believe (The Apostles' Creed)
In Cana at a Wedding Feast (Jesus' Miracles)
In Times of Great Decision  (Election Hymn on NCC Principles)
Jesus Sat and Watched the Crowd  (stewardship)
Jesus, You Once Called Disciples (calling disciples)
Listen, Sisters!  Listen, Brothers! (I Corinthians 15)
Long Ago, God Reached In Love (Covenant and Salvation History)
Looking Back, O God, We Wonder - 350th Anniversary of the New Castle Presbyterian Church
Lord, What A Cloud of Witnesses! (church history)
Lord, What Is All Our Fighting For? (prayer for peace)
Mary Heard the Angel's Message (Mary's Story)
O God of Life, Your Healing Touch (Baylor Medical Mission)
O God of Light, May Our Light Shine  (Matthew 5:13-16)
O God Our Creator, You Work Every Day (Labor Day)
O God, Be Merciful To Me (Psalm 51)
O God, Each Day You Bless Us  A Hymn for the Commitment to Peacemaking
O God, in Your Love (Inclusive Church)
O God, Our Words Cannot Express (9/11)
O God, We Rage at Hurtful Things (healing)
O God, Whose Loving Has No End (funeral)
O God, You Made the Sabbath Day (Sabbath)
O Lord, As You Were On Your Way (transfiguration)
O Lord, You Called Disciples (calling disciples) Bay Minette, AL
On This Day of Celebration (A Hymn for the Millennium Ecumenical Service)
On You All Life Depends* (Jesus’ miracles of healing)
Our God, We Are a Church Reformed (Faith in the Reformed Tradition)
Our God, You Called to Moses (Moses’ call)
Our Lord, You Stood in Pilate’s Hall* (Christ the King Sunday)
Our Lord, You Were Sent (Jesus’ temptation)
Peter Said, “I’m Going Fishing” (post-resurrection account)
Remember Me (various covenant stories)
She Came to Jesus (the Canaanite woman’s faith)
Sing Out! Sound the Trumpets! Proclaim Jubilee! (Jesus' Ministry in Luke 4)
Some Work in Mines So Dark and Deep
Spirit of God (Holy Spirit)
Thank You, God, for Peaceful Ones (peace)
The Earth is the Lord’s (environment)
The Fruit of the Spirit (Galatians 5)
The Storm Came to Honduras (Support for Relief Work)
There Are Many Gifts for Sharing (ordination/installation)
There is a Mighty Question (Jesus' Second Coming and First Sunday of Advent)
This is a Taste of God’s Great Reign*? (Communion)
We Come to This Table (World Communion/Peacemaking)
We Enter Your Church (baptism)
We Gather at Your Table, Lord (Lord's Supper)
We Look to You, O Jesus 300th Anniversary American Presbyterians Oct 1, 2006, in Phila
We Thank You, God, for Teachers (A Hymn for Christian Education)
Welcoming God (Inclusive Church)
What a Joy, This Habitation! (Hymn for Dedication of a Habitat for Humanity Home) BABILONE 8.7.8.7.D "There's a Wideness in God's Mercy"
What a World of Sound (Christmas)
When Did We See You Hungry, Lord? (A Hymn-Dialogue based on Matthew 25:31-46)
When Hands Reach Out (disabilities/abilities)
When Mary Poured a Rich Perfume (anointing of Jesus)
When We Were a Younger Nation   175th Anniversary of First Presbyterian Allentown, PA
When You Are Praying (Jesus' Teaching on Prayer)
Where Is Bread? (hunger and justice issues)
Who Is My Neighbor?* (Jesus’ parable of the Good Samaritan)
Why Is This Night Different? (Passover)
You Call Us, Lord, to Worship (order of worship)
You Formed Us in Your Image, Lord (family ministries)
You Gave Your Church a Voice (Pentecost)
You’ve Called Us Together (COCU/CUIC/ecumenical)
Your Grace Is Overwhelming (workers in the vineyard)
Your Word is Like a Lamp, O Lord (The Bible and Prayer for Illumination)

External links
 "Carolyn Gillette talks to Joshua Rothman About Writing Hymns in Tragic Times" on Politics and More Podcast at The New Yorker website.

1961 births
Living people
American Presbyterian ministers
Former Methodists
Converts to Presbyterianism
American hymnwriters
American women hymnwriters
20th-century American women writers
20th-century American writers
21st-century American women writers
21st-century American writers
People from Harrisonburg, Virginia
Writers from Virginia
Religious leaders from Virginia
Lebanon Valley College alumni